Petr Fulín (born 8 February 1977) is a Czech racing driver. He competed in the European Touring Car Cup, where he has won the championship twice. He is a former World Touring Car Championship driver, who made his debut in 2014.

Racing career
Fulín began his career in 2007 in the BMW 1 Challenge, finishing 2nd in championship. In 2008 he switched to the SEAT León Supercopa Germany championship, racing in the championship for 4 years. Finishing 4th in the championship in 2010 & 2011. Fulín also made few one-off appearances in SEAT León Eurocup and Trofeo Abarth 500 Europe, before switching to the European Touring Car Cup in 2012. Winning the championships in 2013 & 2014 In 2014 Fulín made his World Touring Car Championship debut with Campos Racing driving a SEAT León WTCC in the first round of the championship in Marrakech. However after a crash in qualifying, his car was withdrawn from the event. He later raced in the fourth round of the championship in Slovakia.

In 2015 Fulín returned to the European Touring Car Cup, still racing with Krenek Motorsport however driving a SEAT León Cup Racer instead of his usual BMW 320si.

Racing record

Complete European Touring Car Cup results
(key) (Races in bold indicate pole position) (Races in italics indicate fastest lap)

Complete World Touring Car Championship results
(key) (Races in bold indicate pole position – 1 point awarded just in first race; races in italics indicate fastest lap – 1 point awarded all races; * signifies that driver led race for at least one lap – 1 point given all races)

Complete TCR International Series results
(key) (Races in bold indicate pole position; races in italics indicate fastest lap)

† Driver did not finish the race, but was classified as he completed over 75% of the race distance.

Complete World Touring Car Cup results
(key) (Races in bold indicate pole position) (Races in italics indicate fastest lap)

‡ As Fulín was a Wildcard entry, he was ineligible to score points.

References

External links
 
 

1977 births
Living people
Czech racing drivers
European Touring Car Cup drivers
World Touring Car Championship drivers
World Touring Car Cup drivers
Sportspeople from Plzeň
Campos Racing drivers
TCR Europe Touring Car Series drivers